Gästrikland is a historical province or landskap on the eastern coast of Sweden. It borders Uppland, Västmanland, Dalarna, Hälsingland and the Gulf of Bothnia. Gästrikland is the southernmost of the Norrland  provinces.

Other forms of the name used are Gestricia and Gastrikland. Before 1900, the spelling was officially Gestrikland in Swedish.

Administration 
The traditional  provinces of Sweden serve no administrative or political purposes, but are historical and cultural entities. In the case of Gästrikland the province constitutes the southern part of the administrative county, län,  Gävleborg County.

Heraldry 
Arms granted in 1560. As with other provinces the arms is represented with a ducal coronet. Blazon: "Argent Hurty an Elk statant Gules attired and hoofed Or." A coat of arms for Gävleborg County was granted in 1938, combining the arms of Gästrikland and Hälsingland.

Geography 
Gästrikland is often called the gate to Norrland (the northern Sweden part that is traditionally considered scarcely populated, largely unexplored until the 15th century, and with a terrain dominated by forests, mountains and lakes). Gästrikland was often called the gate to Norrland because from Gästrikland  people went on to the north part of Sweden.

The province uses the slogan "the Iron Kingdom" ("Järnriket").

The main parts of Gästrikland consists of plains, which in the south and east transcends into fertile agricultural areas. To the north the west the terrain becomes hilly and forest covered, unsuitable for agrarian tasks. In the north-western corner one also finds Gästrikland's highest mountain, the Lustigknopp (literally "Funny-hood"), of 402 meters height; this mountain also constitutes the meeting point of the three provinces Gästrikland, Hälsingland and Dalarna.

Few larger water areas are found, but a multitude of small ones, and of the total area around 1/10 is water. Its largest lake is Storsjön with an area of 72 km2, in its central parts.

Gästrikland has one National park: Färnebofjärden.

Sub-divisions 
The sub-division of municipalities is done within the county, not the province. But as the province coincide with the southern municipal borders in Gävleborg County, the following municipalities are in effect located in Gästrikland:

Gävle Municipality
Sandviken Municipality
Hofors Municipality
Ockelbo Municipality

For tourism purposes Älvkarleby Municipality is also considered a part of Gästrikland.

Historically, Gästrikland was sub-divided into chartered cities and court districts. Its cities were: Gävle (chartered around 1400) and Sandviken (chartered in 1943). Its two court districts were Gestricia Eastern Court District and Gestricia Western Court District.

Elections

Riksdag

History 
Gästrikland was a part of Uppland until 14th or 15th century. Mining and iron production became important industries in the 5th century and the iron works of Hofors and Sandviken still employ about 6,500 people, producing specialized steel and other special metals.

Sports
Football in the province is administered by Gestriklands Fotbollförbund. Ice hockey is also popular, with Brynäs IF.

References 

  article Gästrikland from Nordisk familjebok (1909). In Swedish.

External links 
Gästrikland  - Tourist site. In Swedish and English.

 
Provinces of Sweden